203rd may refer to:

203rd Battalion (Winnipeg Rifles), CEF, a unit in the Canadian Expeditionary Force during the First World War
203rd General Hospital, activated in 1941 to meet anticipated military medical needs of a country preparing for war

See also
203 (number)
203, the year 203 (CCIII) of the Julian calendar